Målfrid Kuvås (2 February 1942 - 12 May 2011) is a Norwegian advocate for women's football in Norway who helped to reverse the ban on the sport and to Norway getting their first games. Kuvås is widely viewed as the mother of Norwegian women's football.

References 

1942 births
2011 deaths
People from Skaun
People from Oslo
Norwegian women's footballers
Norwegian sports executives and administrators
Women's association footballers not categorized by position